Nicklas Kulti defeated Todd Woodbridge in the final, 6–4, 6–3 to win the boys' singles tennis title at the 1989 Wimbledon Championships.

Seeds

  Nicklas Kulti (champion)
  Todd Woodbridge (final)
  Johan Anderson (quarterfinals)
  Stefano Pescosolido (first round)
  Wayne Ferreira (semifinals)
  Jared Palmer (quarterfinals)
  Jamie Morgan (third round)
  Fabrice Santoro (third round)
  Arne Thoms (quarterfinals)
  Luis Herrera (quarterfinals)
  Jonathan Stark (third round)
  Mark Knowles (second round)
  Martin Stringari (first round)
  Fernando Meligeni (second round)
  David Rikl (second round)
  Martin Damm (second round)

Draw

Finals

Top half

Section 1

Section 2

Bottom half

Section 3

Section 4

References

External links

Boys' Singles
Wimbledon Championship by year – Boys' singles